Walter Ernest Edward McGrath (9 June 1910 – 6 October 1999) was an Australian rules footballer who played with North Melbourne in the Victorian Football League (VFL).

Notes

External links 

1910 births
1999 deaths
Australian rules footballers from Victoria (Australia)
North Melbourne Football Club players